Zabaka (also Romanized as Zabakā; also known as Zīvekeh) is a village in Lahijan-e Gharbi Rural District, Lajan District, Piranshahr County, West Azerbaijan Province, Iran. At the 2006 census, its population was 191, in 29 families.

References 

Populated places in Piranshahr County